The Central District includes public schools from the Greater Richmond Region. Central District schools compete in 6A, 5A, 4A, and 3A divisions.

The Central District schools are located in the southern part of the Greater Richmond Region, which includes schools in Chesterfield County , Prince George County, Dinwiddie County as well as the independent cities of Petersburg, Virginia , Colonial Heights, and Hopewell, Virginia

Member schools
Colonial Heights High School of Colonial Heights, Virginia
Thomas Dale High School of Chester, Virginia
Dinwiddie High School of Dinwiddie, Virginia
Hopewell High School of Hopewell, Virginia
Matoaca High School of Chesterfield, Virginia
Meadowbrook High School of Chesterfield, Virginia
Petersburg High School of Petersburg, Virginia
Prince George High School of Prince George, Virginia

Virginia High School League